The rufous-winged fulvetta (Schoeniparus castaneceps) is a bird species of the family Pellorneidae. Its common name is misleading, because it is not a close relative of the "typical" fulvettas, which are now in the genus Fulvetta.

The black-crowned fulvetta (S. klossi) was until recently included here as a subspecies.

This 11 cm long bird has a dark-streaked chestnut crown, white supercilium, brown upperparts and pale underparts. The wings show a striking contrast between the bright rufous primaries and the black coverts.

This is a noisy species with a rich warbled ti-du-di-du-di-du-di-du song  and wheezy tsi-tsi-tsi-tsi call. 

It is common in evergreen montane forests above 1200 m ASL, often feeding on vertical trunks.

References

 Collar, N.J. & Robson, Craig (2007): Family Timaliidae (Babblers). In: del Hoyo, Josep; Elliott, Andrew & Christie, D.A. (eds.): Handbook of Birds of the World, Volume 12 (Picathartes to Tits and Chickadees): 70-291. Lynx Edicions, Barcelona.
 Lekagul, Boonsong & Round, Philip (1991): A Guide to the Birds of Thailand. Saha Karn Baet. 
 Robson, Craig (2004): A Field Guide to the Birds of Thailand''. New Holland Press. 

rufous-winged fulvetta
Birds of Eastern Himalaya
Birds of Yunnan
Birds of Southeast Asia
rufous-winged fulvetta
Taxonomy articles created by Polbot